Heinrich August Franz Schroth (23 March 1871 – 14 January 1945) was a German stage and film actor.

Career
Schroth was born in Pirmasens, Rhineland-Palatinate, Germany. He made his acting debut at the Sigmaringen Royal Theatre in 1890. In 1894 he went to the Municipal Theatre in Augsburg, in 1896 to Mainz and in 1897 to the Royal Court Theatre in Hanover. From 1899 to 1905, he spent six years as a part of the ensemble of the Deutsches Schauspielhaus in Hamburg and from 1905 onwards at various Berlin theatres.

Schroth made his film debut in the 1916 Walter Schmidthässler-directed drama Welker Lorbeer. He spent the 1910s in numerous German silent film productions, working with such directors as George Jacoby, Robert Wiene and Harry Piel. His career in the 1920s was prolific, and he appeared opposite such silent film actors as Lil Dagover, Emil Jannings, Paul Wegener and Brigitte Helm and transitioned to sound film with ease.

During World War II Heinrich Schroth participated in a large number of film productions for the Nazi Party, including propaganda films for the Nazi regime. In the final phase of the Second World War, Reich Minister of Propaganda Joseph Goebbels placed Schroth on the Gottbegnadeten list ("God-gifted list" or "Important Artist Exempt List"), a 36-page list of artists considered crucial to Nazi culture. Schroth's most memorable role of the World War II era is possibly that of the role of Herr von Neuffer in the 1940 Veit Harlan-directed, anti-Semitic melodrama Jud Süß, commissioned by Joseph Goebbels.

Schroth's stage and film career spanned five decades. He died in January 1945.

Personal life
Heinrich Schroth was married three times. Little is known of his first wife. The couple had a son, Heinz Schroth (1902–1957). His second wife was Else Ruttersheim, with whom he had a son, actor and director Carl-Heinz Schroth (aka Heinz Sailer) in 1902. His third wife was German actress Käthe Haack, with whom he had a daughter, actress Hannelore Schroth in 1922.

Selected filmography
 The Queen's Love Letter (1916)
 The Queen's Secretary (1916)
 Dr. Hart's Diary (1917) as Dr. Robert Hart
 The Nun and the Harlequin (1918)
 The Rolling Hotel (1918) as Joe Deebs
 Countess Kitchenmaid (1918) as Count Gyllenhand
 The Salamander Ruby (1918) as Attenhofer
 Put to the Test (1918) as Count von Steinitz,
 The Rat (1918) as Joe Deebs
 Out of the Depths (1919) as the American
 Madeleine (1919)
 The Muff (1919) as Joe Deebs
 The Skull of Pharaoh's Daughter (1920)
 Respectable Women (1920)
 Demon Blood (1920)
 The Eyes as the Accuser (1920) as Detective Bill Roid
 My Wife's Diary (1920)
 Jim Cowrey is Dead (1921)
 The Drums of Asia (1921) as Hopkins
 Love and Passion (1921)
 The False Dimitri (1922) as Jurjew
 Shadows of the Past (1922) as Henrik Krag 
 Marie Antoinette, the Love of a King (1922) as the Count of Orléans
 The Strumpet's Plaything (1922)
 The Homecoming of Odysseus (1922)
 All for Money (1923) as the director of the Phönix-Werke
 The Sensational Trial (1923) as the "Contestable Existence"
 And Yet Luck Came (1923)
 Horrido (1924)
 The Heart of Lilian Thorland (1924)
 Living Buddhas (1925) as Dr. Smith
 People to Each Other (1926)
 The Great Duchess (1926) as Steenberg
 Tea Time in the Ackerstrasse (1926)
 The Poacher (1926) as Count Oetzbach
 The Lady with the Tiger Skin (1927) as Henry Seymor
 Prinz Louis Ferdinand (1927) as Yorck
 The Great Adventuress (1928)
 Alraune (1928) as a bar patron
 The President (1928) as Deon Ramirez
 Misled Youth (1929) as the commissioner
 Atlantik (1929) as Harry von Schroeder
 1914 (1931) as War Minister von Falkenhayn
 Berlin-Alexanderplatz (1931)
 The Fate of Renate Langen (1931) as Schrott
 The Captain from Köpenick (1931) as the police chief
 No Money Needed (1932)
 Man Without a Name (1932)
 The First Right of the Child (1932)
 Girls of Today (1933)
 A City Upside Down (1933)  as Revisionsrat
 William Tell (1934) as the Imperial commander
 At the Strasbourg (1934) as the commandant
 Stradivari (1935)
 The Schimeck Family (1935)
 The Emperor's Candlesticks (1936) as conspirator
 Uncle Bräsig (1936) as Karl Hawermann
 The Traitor (1936) as the general manager of T-Metallwerke
 Woman's Love—Woman's Suffering (1937) as the attending physician
 The Coral Princess (1937) as Dr. Milich
 The Ruler (1937) as Direktor Hofer
 Urlaub auf Ehrenwort (1938) as the  lieutenant Colonel
 Comrades at Sea (1938) as the capitain of the Marana
 Covered Tracks (1938) as Count Duval
The Secret Lie (1938) as Chefarzt
 Dance on the Volcano (1938)
 The Merciful Lie (1939)
 The Right to Love (1939)
 Water for Canitoga (1939)  as Gouverneur
 Target in the Clouds (1939) as Commander von Selbitz
Jud Süss (1940) as Mr. Von Neuffer
 Friedemann Bach (1941) as the landlord of Baron von Solnau
 The Dismissal (1942) as General von Caprivi
 The Great King (1942) as General Balthasar Rudolf von Schenckendorf
Melody of a Great City (1943) as the old man

References

External links
 

1871 births
1945 deaths
German male film actors
German male stage actors
German male silent film actors
People from Pirmasens
19th-century German male actors
20th-century German male actors
People from the Palatinate (region)